MathFest is a mathematics conference hosted annually in late summer by the Mathematical Association of America. It is known for its dual focus on teaching and research in mathematics, as well as for student participation.

MathFest Locations 

The 2015 meeting in Washington, D.C. was an extra day long in order to include events to mark the centennial anniversary of the MAA.

The 2020 meeting in Philadelphia, PA  was cancelled due to the COVID-19 pandemic.

The 2021 meeting was held virtually due to the COVID-19 pandemic.

Events 
MathFest features many annual lectures, such as the Earle Raymond Hedrick Lecture Series, which consists of up to three lectures by the same presenter, on three consecutive days,
 and the AWM-MAA Falconer Lecture, which is given by a distinguished female mathematician or mathematics educator.

Notes

External links 
 List of national Mathfest meetings of the MAA

Mathematics conferences
Mathematical Association of America
Mathematics education in the United States
Festival organizations in North America